The Bassline is a popular music venue and club in Johannesburg, South Africa. The original Bassline, established in 1994 in the Melville neighborhood of Johannesburg, closed in 2003, only to reopen in Newtown.

As well as being popular among young residents of the city, the Bassline became an important stage for some of the hottest Jazz musicians in South Africa. Many popular albums were recorded live at the Bassline, and the record company of the same name became a fixture in the Johannesburg music scene.

Musicians who have played at the Bassline include Vusi Mahlasela, Marcus Wyatt, and Tumi and the Volume.

The Bassline also inspired a fictional identity as an important place-name in the novel Live at the Bassline.

Culture of Johannesburg
Music venues in South Africa
Music venues completed in 1994
1994 establishments in South Africa
20th-century architecture in South Africa